Mamala is a suburb of Kochi city in the state of Kerala, India. It is situated around 9 km (5.6 mi) from Vytilla Junction and around 13 km (8 mi) from Ernakulam South railway station.

Etymology
The word meaning of "Mamala" - Mamala is mountain ranges or we can say the starting of mid rage hills of western ghats and end of the planes near to the sea and its connected low lands.
Mamala ...was a border check post between Kochi and Thiruvithamkoor (tranvcore) state before 1950. British called  as Mamalay, this usage can be seen at the old building of excise office at Mamala and there is a stone representing the border with letter "KO" (malayalam) in west side and "THI" on east side of that stone placed at bottom of the small bridge. Chottanikkara temple is around 5 km away and also, mamala is situated on the Munnar-Madurai highway.

References 

Kerala
Kochi